Priit Volmer (born 6 September 1978 in Tartu) is an Estonian opera singer (bass).

Priit Volmer's father was singer and actor Peeter Volmer. In 2000, he graduated from Estonian Academy of Music and Theatre in singing speciality.

1998–2000, he was an opera chorus artist in Vanemuine Theatre, and 2000–2004 in Estonian National Opera. 2004–2013, he was a soloist in Estonian National Opera. Since 2016, he is working again in Estonian National Opera.

Awards:
 2005: Theatre Prize of Harjumaa 
 2008: Marje and Kuldar Sink Prize for Young Singer
 2008 and 2017: Colleague Prize of Estonian National Opera 
 2013 and 2017: Estonian National Opera SEB Audience Award
 2013: Estonian Theatre annual award

Opera roles

 Mityukha (Modest Mussorgsky's Boris Godunov)
 Third Tramp (Carl Orff's Die Kluge)
 Vagabond (Der Mond)
 Adolf Eichmann (Erkki-Sven Tüür's Wallenberg)

References

Living people
1978 births
21st-century Estonian male opera singers
Estonian Academy of Music and Theatre alumni
Hugo Treffner Gymnasium alumni
Musicians from Tartu